Macapagal (rare variant: Makapagal) is a Filipino surname derived from the Kapampangan language.

The family claims noble descent from Dola de Goiti Dula, a legitimate grandchild of Lakan Dula, the last "王" or King of Tondo "東都" (Dongdu). It is the only known branch of the Seludong's royal family to have survived the Majapahit Empire's invasion, the Sultanate of Brunei's pogrom against native royals, Chinese warlord Limahong's massacres, and the fallout from the Tondo Conspiracy. The family survived due to Martin de Goiti's giving of his Mestiza (Half Aztec and Half-Spanish) daughter in marriage to Batang Dula, the eldest son of Lakan Bunao Dula of the Lakanate of Tondo. As time went on, they incorporated the descendants from the two other royal houses: the house of Rajah Matanda (ऋअज ंअतन्द) and the house of Tariq Suleiman (سليمان).

The family then migrated to Pampanga and Northern Samar after the Spanish assumed control of Manila.

The following are people possessing the Macapagal surname:

People
Don Juan Macapagal (d. 1683), former prince of Tondo and first documented bearer of the surname. Great-grandson of Lakandula
Lazaro Macapagal (c. 1860s), officer of the revolutionary army during the Philippine Revolution. Commanding officer ordered to execute Andrés Bonifacio
Diosdado Macapagal (1910-1997), former 9th President of the Philippines and 5th Vice President of the Philippines
Gloria Macapagal Arroyo (born 1947), daughter of Diosdado Macapagal; former Speaker of the House of Representatives of the Philippines, 14th President of the Philippines and 10th Vice President of the Philippines
Mikey Macapagal Arroyo (born 1969), son of Gloria  Macapagal Arroyo; served as representative and vice governor of Pampanga
Diosdado Macapagal Arroyo (born 1974), son of Gloria  Macapagal Arroyo; served as representative of Camarines Sur 
Maan Macapagal, television news reporter

Places
Diosdado Macapagal Boulevard, motorway in Metro Manila
Macapagal Bridge, bridge in Butuan, Agusan del Sur
President Diosdado P. Macapagal Highway, highway in Davao Oriental

Kapampangan-language surnames
Macapagal family